The 2014–15 Deutsche Eishockey Liga season was the 21st season since the founding of the Deutsche Eishockey Liga. It started on 12 September 2014 and ended on 22 April 2015.

Teams

Regular season

Standings

Results

Matches 1–26

Matches 27–52

Statistics

Scoring leaders
List shows the top skaters sorted by points, then goals.

GP = Games played; G = Goals; A = Assists; Pts = Points; +/− = Plus/minus; PIM = Penalties in minutes; POS = Position
Source: DEL.org

Leading goaltenders
Only the top five goaltenders, based on save percentage, who have played at least 40% of their team's minutes, are included in this list.
TOI = Time on ice (minutes:seconds); SA = Shots against; GA = Goals against; GAA = Goals against average; Sv% = Save percentage; SO = Shutouts
Source: DEL.org

Playoffs

Playoff qualification
The playoff qualification was played between 4–8 March 2015 in a best-of-three mode.

EHC Wolfsburg vs. Krefeld Pinguine

Thomas Sabo Ice Tigers vs. Eisbären Berlin

Bracket

Quarterfinals
The quarterfinals were played between 11–24 March 2015 in a best-of-seven mode.

Adler Mannheim vs. Thomas Sabo Ice Tigers

EHC München vs. EHC Wolfsburg

ERC Ingolstadt vs. Iserlohn Roosters

Hamburg Freezers vs. Düsseldorfer EG

Semifinals
The semifinals were played between 27 March to 4 April 2015 in a best-of-seven mode.

Adler Mannheim vs. EHC Wolfsburg

ERC Ingolstadt vs. Düsseldorfer EG

Finals
The finals will be played between 10 and 24 April 2015 in a best-of-seven mode.

References

External links
Official website

2014-15
1
ger